The Route du Rhum is a single person transatlantic race first run in 1978.

The inaugural race had an unusually close finish for a trans ocean race of this era where boats varied so much. Under 8 minutes separated Mike Birch on his trimaran and Michel Malinovski, as can be seen in vintage footage.

Gallery

Results

Source:

References

External links
 
 Official You Tube Channel
 

Route du Rhum
1978 in sailing
Route du Rhum
Single-handed sailing competitions